Conrad Electronic SE  is a European multinational retailer of electronic products based in Hirschau, Germany.

Company profile 
The company was founded in Berlin in 1923 by Max Conrad, and moved to Hirschau in 1946, where it was led by Max Conrad's son Werner. In 1973, directorship of the company WERCO was passed on to his son , then aged 37. The company subsequently became Conrad-Elektronik. In 1997, Klaus Conrad handed over directorship to his son Werner Conrad.

Product range 
The product range is focused on consumer and specialist electronics lines, including computing equipment, multimedia, modeling, home automation, tools, electronic components, batteries and power and motoring products.

International offices 
In addition to the Conrad group's headquarters in Germany, there are local offices in France, Slovakia, Sweden, Switzerland, Italy, the Netherlands covering the entire Benelux region and Austria, which also covers the United Kingdom. Partnerships exist with companies in Hungary, Poland, Slovenia, Czech Republic and Romania. Furthermore, Conrad is active in Russia and China. Conrad has its own purchase centre in Hong Kong and a central warehouse in Germany. Conrad took over British company Rapid Electronics of Colchester, Essex, in December 2012.

See also

References

External links

 

Electronics companies of Germany
1923 establishments in Germany
Online retailers of Germany
Electronic component distributors
Companies based in Bavaria